Hatlestrand  is a village in Kvinnherad municipality in Vestland county, Norway.  The village is located along the Hardangerfjorden, northeast of the villages of Husa and Ølve.  The village has a ferry port called Gjermundshamn, which has regular ferry connections to the island of Varaldsøy and to Årsnes on the opposite side of the fjord.  Hatlestrand Church is located in the village.

The rest of the Hatlestrand area is more rural with another 250 residents.

References

Villages in Vestland
Kvinnherad